(Greek , "contrasting arguments") is a rhetorical exercise of unknown authorship, most likely dating to just after the Peloponnesian War (431–404 BC) based on comments within the exercise's text. The exercise is intended to help an individual gain deeper understanding of an issue by forcing them to consider it from the angle of their opponent, which may serve either to strengthen their argument or to help the debaters reach compromise.

Dating and Authorship
The composition date of the work is unknown; scholars have historically looked to the text itself for clues as to its origin, a method that produces only ambiguous results at best. The work is largely written in the Doric dialect, but contains small examples of the Attic and Ionian dialects as well. One possible clue as to the date of the work is the mention of the offspring of Polyclitus, a well-known Greek sculptor. However, in Protagoras 328c, the usually attentive Plato claims Polyclitus to have in fact two sons, not just one. Another interesting reference possibly dating the text is its mention of a victory of Sparta over Athens and her allies in section 1.8. At face value, most tend to accept this as a reference to the Peloponnesian War, and thus claim that the  must have been written after this war's terminal date, 404 BC. While this is most probably true, it is by no means sure, because there are other instances of Spartan victory over Athens which add uncertainty to this dating, such as the Battle of Tanagra in 457 BC.

Interpretation
What cannot be denied is the confounding nature with which the  conveys its message. For instance, in the very first chapter, the author states "some say that what is good and what is bad are two different things, others that they are the same thing..I myself side with the latter group", yet by the end of this chapter, it has changed "I am trying rather to point out that it is not the same thing which is bad and good, but that each is different from the other 

Rosamond Sprague argues that good and bad cannot be the same and are, in fact, different from each other, exemplifying this by examining the concept of war; if both good and bad were the same, then by doing a great deal of harm, one would also be doing the opposing side the greatest of good.  , also called , is a two-fold argument, which considers each side of an argument in hopes of coming to a deeper truth. It is similar to a form of debate with oneself and holds that contradiction is an inevitable consequence of discourse. Daniel Silvermintz notes that while the  purports to offer a consideration of both the absolutist and relativist positions, the latter chapters defending the sophists demonstrate its allegiance to the relativist position.

Rhetoric 
In ancient Greece, students of rhetoric would be asked to speak and write for both sides of a controversy. He says that people must be persuaded to one side or the other in order to act, and this is accomplished through . Edward Schiappa put the concept into the following form: "X can be Y and not-Y."

It could be that the  could have been derived from Protagoras himself, and may have even been an influence on Plato while he was writing his Protagoras. The exercise considers demonstrating contrasting arguments in a single oration a method of demonstrating skill. Protagoras stated that every argument had two contradicting sides, both of which could be argued. This idea emphasizes the power and versatility of language. considers that rhetoric can be situational. "Excavating the Dissoi Logoi 4". Oxford Studies in Ancient Philosophy: 250'</ref>

The  speaks in detail about the acquisition of language in humans, which is ultimately determined to be learned, not inherent (6.12). The author comes to this conclusion through the question, "What if a Greek child is born in Greece and immediately sent to live in Persia?", with the answer being that the child would speak Persian, not Greek, and therefore language must be learned. A similar debate is waged in Herodotus's Histories 2.2, where an Egyptian king, Psammetichus, attempts to determine the world's first language by raising two newborns completely in lack of language.  The children independently begin to speak Phrygian, which is then determined to be the first language of man. Both Herodotus, and the author of the  seem to have invested thought into the developments of language.

Publication
Thomas Gale first published a version of it with a commentary of his own in 1671. The first edition with an apparatus criticus was published by Ernst Weber in 1897.

Notes

Bibliography
 T. M.  Robinson (ed.), Contrasting Arguments: An Edition of the Dissoi Logoi'', London, Arno Press, 1979.

Dialectic
Rhetorical techniques
Philosophical methodology
Ancient Greek philosophical literature
Presocratic philosophy